Train Station is a multi-director feature film from CollabFeature, the filmmaking team that created The Owner.

Plot
Train Station follows a single character, known only as "The Person in Brown", played by 40 different actors who vary in age, gender, ethnicity and sexual orientation. Along the character's journey, he/she is presented with a series of choices - some minor, some life-altering. Each time a choice is made, the film switches to a new cast in a new city, and the story continues, helmed by a new director. Cities include Berlin, Bogota, Dubai, Jakarta, Los Angeles, Singapore, Tehran and 20 others on five continents. Train Station unites cultures and breaks language barriers, reminding us that we all live in the same world full of diversity, options and consequences.

Reception 
Critical reception has been positive. PopCultureBeast called it "the definition of collaborative experimentation in cinema"

Festivals
 The film premiered at the 2015 East Lansing Film Festival, on November 7 in East Lansing, Michigan, US.
 East Lansing (MI) Film Festival; Sudan Independent Film Festival; Berlin Independent Film Festival; DC Independent Film Festival; Riverside (CA) International Film Festival; Los Angeles Diversity Film Festival (Winner, Best Feature); Cordoba Film Festival; Blackstar International Film Festival (Ghana); "The Goddess on the Throne" Film Festival (Kosovo; Winner, Best Feature); BALINALE International Film Festival (Bali); Kansas International Film Festival (Winner, Best Feature); Casa Asia Film Week (Barcelona); Miami International Film Festival (Winner, Best Feature Film for April, 2016); Calcutta International Cult Film Festival (Winner, Best Narrative Feature for November, 2016); Pune Independent Film Festival (India)

Cast 
 Gustavo Valezzi
 Xavier Agudo
 Ryan Bajornas
 Surya Balakrishnan
 Nicola Barnaba
 Petras Baronas
 Juliane Block
 Leroux Botha
 Julia Caiuby
 Gregory Cattell
 Therese Cayaba
 David Cerqueiro
 Diane Cheklich
 Violetta D'Agata
 Felix A. Dausend
 Tiago P. de Carvalho
 Hesam Dehghani
 Giovanni Esposito
 Todd Felderstein
 Ingrid Franchi
 Yango Gonzalez
 Vania Ivanova
 Yosef Khouwes
 George Korgianitis
 Kevin Rumley
 Joycelyn Lee
 Craig Lines
 Michael Vincent Mercado
 Athanasia Michopoulou
 Daniel Montoya
 Omer Moutasim
 Marc Oberdorfer
 Aditya Powar
 Tony Pietra
 Adam Ruszkowski
 Andrés Sandoval
 Guillem Serrano
 Marty She
 Mahmoud Elsarraj

See also 
List of films shot over three or more years

References

External links
 
 https://web.archive.org/web/20151223040119/http://elff.com/Films/train-station/

2015 films
American crime drama films
American mystery drama films
2010s American films
2010s English-language films
2010s Persian-language films
2010s Indonesian-language films
2010s Spanish-language films
2010s Italian-language films
2010s German-language films
2010s Greek-language films
2010s Hindi-language films
2010s Portuguese-language films
2010s Arabic-language films
2010s Romanian-language films